Rogues Gallery is the twelfth studio album by the British rock group Slade. It was released by RCA on 29 March 1985 and reached number 60 in the UK charts. The album was largely produced by John Punter, with bassist Jim Lea producing "Harmony", "I Win, You Lose" and "Time to Rock". For this release, the band set out to create an album of radio-friendly, potential hit singles which would be released as singles somewhere across the world.

The US version of the album, which was released on the CBS label, replaced "All Join Hands" with the band's 1981 UK hit "Lock Up Your Daughters" (which had originally appeared on the band's album Till Deaf Do Us Part).

Background
After the band's 1984 breakthrough in America with the Top 40 singles "Run Runaway" and "My Oh My", the band were to go on tour that year with Ozzy Osbourne for six weeks. Prior to the tour, the band played a few warm-up shows. However, on the first night of the tour with Osbourne, Slade had to cancel the remainder of the shows when Lea collapsed after the first gig and was diagnosed with hepatitis. Coinciding with the breakdown of lead vocalist Noddy Holder's marriage, the band agreed to stop touring to allow Holder a break. Meanwhile, the band would continue to record.

Still contracted to RCA, the band set out to record their 12th studio album later in 1984. After the success of "Run Runaway" and "My Oh My", producer John Punter was hired to produce most of the album. The lead single "All Join Hands" was released in November 1984 and reached No. 15 in the UK. However, the following single, "7 Year Bitch", released in January 1985, stalled at No. 60 after the song's title caused it to be met with resistance on radio. The third single "Myzsterious Mizster Jones" was released in March and peaked at No. 50. The same month saw the release of Rogues Gallery, which peaked at No. 60 in the UK and No. 132 in the US. In America and certain European territories, "Little Sheila" was released as a single in April. It reached No. 86 on the US Billboard Hot 100 and No. 13 on the Mainstream Rock Chart. The album was a bigger success in a number of European territories.

Speaking to Kerrang! shortly before the album's release, Lea said: "I think this record has a more rounded quality than anything we've done before. For a start, we've actually gone in and demoed the new material before recording properly. The album is still heavy, lots of guitars, five and six-minute numbers, but everything sounds much more tuneful, meaning there are lots of potential singles on it. There are no long solos but there are some great guitar parts, hot and fast breaks."

In a 1986 fan club interview, guitarist Dave Hill recalled his feelings about the album: "I personally think it lacked something. I mean it was a good sounding LP, but maybe it had a bit too much quality. I think it lacked a certain amount of soul, or maybe guts. I think that maybe too many of the songs on Rogues Gallery sounded like pop hits, so the album began to lean too much to being regarded as a sort of 'poppy' album, and there is nothing worse than that for me."

In a 1990 fan club interview, Holder said of the album's recording process and result: "It became a bit of a saga, it took a lot of time and eventually turned out to be a great album although I feel there was something missing - something that is the Slade trademark was missing."

Recording
The album was recorded at Angel Recording Studios, Portland Studios, RAK Studios and Utopia Studios. It was mixed at Air Studios and The Workhouse. Before the album's release, the album's working title was Partners in Crime and the original sleeve design was conceived with this title.

Promotion
During autumn 1984 and spring 1985, a full European tour was announced and tickets were put on sale. However, the band had not actually confirmed that they would tour, nor had any contracts been signed. Owing to Holder's existing stance on touring, the tour was soon cancelled. Had the 1985 leg of the tour taken place, Lea was considering adding a keyboard player to Slade's stage show.

Noddy Holder spoke about the tour in a 1986 fan club interview: "Although it was virtually me that cancelled it for the personal reasons - that tour was never confirmed. The agent and promoter started promoting it and selling the tickets, and we hadn't even confirmed that we were going to do the tour. The tickets had already been on sale for two months and nobody bothered to tell us!"

Critical reception

Upon release, Sounds noted the album was made up of "high quality power pop, glorious hooks, instant singalongs, ultra-catchy terrace-style chants and anthemic, hymn-like ballads". In America, reviews were also positive overall. Billboard recommended the album and commented: "Modern, muscular and metallic, Slade can hold their own on the present hard rock scene." Deseret News stated: "Slade is the epitome of a rock band: catchy melodies, infectious rhythms and the most enjoyable lyrical pacing in contemporary music. Rogues Gallery is one of the finest examples of rabble-rousing rock 'n' roll to come along in years... [and] a guaranteed winner." Record-Journal concluded: "The main problem with the album is getting past the first song. If you hang in, however, what follows on Rogues Gallery is some of the most enthusiastic hard rock in recent years, and some of the least annoying."

The Press-Courier wrote: "Veteran quartet is long of toothe but still capable of blowing out amplifiers and speakers." The Canadian Leader-Post felt that Rogues Gallery was a "neater effort" than the preceding Keep Your Hands Off My Power Supply, and concluded: "They may be long in the tooth, but they haven't lost their bite." Rich Harry of The Morning Call said: "Slade let non-of that I'm-old-there-fore-I-hurt guff gem up their fine new LP. Resembling Geritol on plastic, the album is a fine pop primer for enjoying life while approaching the gloomy pit stop of middle age."

AllMusic retrospectively reviewed the album, which summarised: "Unfortunately for everyone, the decision was made to lay on a whole pile of keyboards this time out; the end result was an album that was far less endearing than Keep Your Hands Off My Power Supply. The rogues' gallery concept probably would have been a lot more convincing if the music had been stripped of the keyboards and overly slick production and given more of a rock & roll edge." Joe Geesin of the webzine Get Ready to Rock described the album as a "fine polished set". He added: "Fat choruses as you'd expect. This is Slade turned state-of-the-art, something you would never have expected."

Track listing

Charts

Personnel
Slade
Noddy Holder -  lead vocals, backing vocals
Dave Hill - lead guitar, backing vocals
Jim Lea - bass guitar, keyboards, guitar, violin, backing vocals, producer (tracks 3, 8-9)
Don Powell - drums

Additional personnel
John Punter - mixing, producer (tracks 1-2, 5-7, 10)
Frank Barretta - assistant engineer (not credited)
Brian Aris Design - photography
Estuary English - artwork (design)

References 

Slade albums
1985 albums
Albums produced by John Punter
Albums produced by Jim Lea
RCA Records albums
CBS Records albums
Albums recorded at RAK Studios